Shankar Hussain is a 1977 Bollywood film directed by Yusuf Naqvi. It has memorable songs; Kahin ek Masoom nazuk si ladki sung by Mohammed Rafi and Aap yoon faaslon se and 'Apne aap raaton mein', sung by Lata, classics of Khayyam's repertoire.

Plot
Dr. Uday Shankar is a kind-hearted Hindu gentleman who has chosen to practise medicine in a village rather than make money by working in a large city. Once, a devastating flood hits a nearby village and he goes there to minister to the affected people. At this time, he happens to rescue a Muslim child, Husain, whose entire family has been wiped out. He raises the boy as his own, alongside his own son, Ajay. As a good Hindu, he decides to raise the boy in the religion of his own parents, and Husain thus grows up to be a practising Muslim living in the backdrop of a Hindu household. Everyone loves the new addition to the household and Husain also is deeply attached to his new family.

Years later, Husain is studying in college while Ajay returns home after completing his medical studies. Shortly after this, Dr. Uday Shankar dies and Ajay devotes himself to carrying on his father's good name and legacy by serving the poor people of his village as a doctor. Meanwhile, Husain falls in love with a Muslim girl named Gulsum. Ajay also falls in love with a Hindu girl named Kusum. Things get complicated when they find out that Gulsum and Kusum are the same girl. Soon a series of unfortunate events puts Dr. Uday Shankar's family in turmoil and Husain rises up to save his foster family's good name. What is the mystery behind the girl that both brothers have fallen in love with? How will Husain save the honor and dignity of his family?

Cast
Pradeep Kumar   
Kanwaljit Singh  
Madhu Chanda   
Suhail   
Gajanan Jagirdar   
Shreeram Lagoo   
Jalal Agha   
Dina Pathak

Songs
The film is noted for its songs by Khayyam.

External links
 
 Shankar Hussain at Bollywood Hungama

1977 films
1970s Hindi-language films
Films scored by Khayyam
Indian interfaith romance films
Films about Islam
Films about Hinduism